Lycaste xytriophora is a species of terrestrial orchid that occurs from Costa Rica to Ecuador.

References

External links 

xytriophora
Orchids of Costa Rica
Orchids of Ecuador